František Šretr (15 January 1893 – 24 July 1952) was a Czech athlete. He competed in the men's long jump and the men's triple jump at the 1920 Summer Olympics.

References

External links
 

1893 births
1952 deaths
Athletes (track and field) at the 1920 Summer Olympics
Czech male long jumpers
Czech male triple jumpers
Olympic athletes of Czechoslovakia
Sportspeople from Pardubice